Craig L. Gidney is an American speculative fiction novelist and short story writer. He is openly gay.

His works are known for mixing genres, containing elements of horror, fantasy, folklore, and magical realism. The collection Sea, Swallow Me features short stories in diverse settings and sub-genres, including queer historical fiction as well as speculative fiction. Gidney counts Octavia Butler and Toni Morrison among his influences. His work often incorporates research on the queer history of the Harlem Renaissance.

Works

 Sea, Swallow Me & Other Stories (Lethe Press, 2008)
 Skin Deep Magic (Rebel Satori Press, 2014)
 Bereft (Tiny Satchel Press, 2013)
 The Nectar of Nightmares (Strange Alphabets Press, 2018)
 A Spectral Hue (Word Horde, 2019)

Awards and nominations

 Susan C. Petrey Scholarship, Clarion West Writers Workshop (1996)
 Gaylactic Spectrum Finalist for “A Bird of Ice”, 2008
 Lambda Literary Awards Finalist for Sea, Swallow Me & Other Stories, 2008
 Lambda Literary Awards Finalist for Skin Deep Magic, 2014
 Bronze Moonbeam Medal for Bereft, 2014
 Silver Independent Publisher Book Awards for Bereft, 2014

References

Living people
21st-century American novelists
21st-century American short story writers
African-American novelists
African-American short story writers
Afrofuturist writers
American male novelists
American science fiction writers
Black speculative fiction authors
American gay writers
LGBT African Americans
American LGBT novelists
American male short story writers
American male non-fiction writers
Year of birth missing (living people)
21st-century American male writers
21st-century African-American writers
21st-century LGBT people
African-American male writers